is a passenger railway station located in Tama-ku, Kawasaki, Kanagawa Prefecture, Japan, operated by the East Japan Railway Company (JR East).

Lines
Nakanoshima Station is served by the Nambu Line. The station is  the southern terminus of the line at Kawasaki Station.

Station layout
The station consists of two opposed side platforms serving two tracks, connected by a footbridge. The station is staffed.

Platforms

History
Nakanoshima Station was opened on 1 November 1927, as a station on the Nambu Railway. Freight operations began in 1929. The Nambu Railway was nationalized on 1 April 1944, and the station came under the control of the Japan National Railways (JNR). The station was relocated  towards Noborito Station in December 1945. Freight operations were discontinued after 1955. After the privatization of the JNR on 1 April 1987, the station was absorbed into the JR East network.

Passenger statistics
In fiscal 2019, the station was used by an average of 14,824 passengers daily (boarding passengers only).

The passenger figures (boarding passengers only) for previous years are as shown below.

Surrounding area
 Nakanoshima Kitaguchi Dori Shopping Street
 Nakanoshima Chuo-dori Shopping Street.

See also
 List of railway stations in Japan

References

External links

 JR East Station info 

Railway stations in Kanagawa Prefecture
Railway stations in Japan opened in 1927
Railway stations in Kawasaki, Kanagawa